Tropitoidea, formerly Tropitaceae, is an extinct superfamily of ammonite cephalopods in the order Ceratitida, containing the following families:
Didymitidae
Episculitidae
Haloritidae
Juvavitidae
Parathisbitidae
Thisbitidae
Tropiceltidae
Tropiceltitidae
Tropitidae

References

 The Paleobiology Database Accessed on 1/14/12

 
Ceratitida superfamilies